The 1650s BC was a decade lasting from January 1, 1659 BC to December 31, 1650 BC.

Events and trends
 c. 1655 BC—Tan-Uli, the ruler of the Elamite Empire, dies.
 c. 1650 BC—Greeks start to live in Mycenae. 
 c. 1650 BC—Middle Kingdom ends in Ancient Egypt (other date is 1674 BC).
 c. 1650 BC—Second Intermediate Period starts in Ancient Egypt (other date is 1674 BC).
 c. 1650 BC – "Flotilla" fresco, from Room 5 of West House, Akrotiri (prehistoric city), Thera, is made. Second Palace period. It is now kept in National Archaeological Museum, Athens.
 Egypt—Start of Seventeenth Dynasty.
 c. 1650 BC—Between Rapperswil and Hurden, on the so-called Seedamm, a first wooden bridge was constructed on Lake Zürich in Switzerland
 c. 1650 BC—The last Woolly mammoths die on Wrangel Island, rendering the species extinct.
 c. 1650 BC—The Rhind Mathematical Papyrus is produced.
 c. 1650 BC—Beginning of construction of 900-acre Poverty Point settlement earthworks (now northern Louisiana) by NA hunter-gatherers.

References